Fabio Scozzoli (born 8 August 1988) is an Italian swimmer. At the 2012 World Short Course Championships, he won the gold medal in the 100 metre breaststroke. He is the 2022 Mediterranean champion in the 50 metre breaststroke.

Career
On 25 July 2011 won the silver medal at the World Championships in Shanghai in the 100 m breaststroke, beaten by Alexander Dale Oen and in front of Cameron van der Burgh, also establishing two Italians records: in the semi-final with a time of 59.83 and in the final with a time of 59.42. On 27 July 2011 has also won the silver medal in the 50m breaststroke, behind Brazilian Felipe França Silva and again in front of Cameron van der Burgh, also establishing the Italian record in that distance with a time of 27.17. On 13 December 2012 Scozzoli became the first Italian swimmer ever to win a gold medal in a World Swimming Championships (25 m) competition winning the Men's 100 metre breaststroke at Istanbul 2012.

Once back in Italy, the 4 August has improved the primacy of the Italian and European short course 50m breaststroke in, held by Alessandro Terrin, winning the Italian title in summer leagues.

At the 2022 Mediterranean Games, on the second day of swimming competition, Scozzoli set a new Games record in the preliminaries of the 50 metre breaststroke with a time of 27.17 seconds and qualified for the final ranking first overall. In the final, later the same day, he won the gold medal with a time of 26.97 seconds, lowering the Games record he set in the morning by 0.20 seconds and finishing 0.03 seconds ahead of short course metres world record holder in the event Emre Sakçı of Turkey.

Scozzoli was named as a team captain on the Italy swim team for the 2022 European Aquatics Championships, held in Rome, with an age of 34 years old as of the start date of the competition. In the 50 metre breaststroke on day five, he narrowly ranked third overall in the preliminaries with a time of 26.89 seconds, which was 0.04 seconds behind second-ranked Simone Cerasuolo also of Italy, and did not qualify for the semifinals as he was not one of the two fastest Italians.

Olympic achievements

See also
 Italian swimmers multiple medalists at the internetional competitions

References

External links
 Swimmer profile at Federnuoto.it

1988 births
Living people
Italian male swimmers
Italian male breaststroke swimmers
World Aquatics Championships medalists in swimming
Sportspeople from the Province of Ravenna
Swimmers at the 2012 Summer Olympics
Olympic swimmers of Italy
Medalists at the FINA World Swimming Championships (25 m)
European Aquatics Championships medalists in swimming
Mediterranean Games gold medalists for Italy
Mediterranean Games bronze medalists for Italy
Swimmers at the 2009 Mediterranean Games
Swimmers at the 2013 Mediterranean Games
Swimmers at the 2018 Mediterranean Games
Swimmers at the 2022 Mediterranean Games
Universiade medalists in swimming
Male medley swimmers
Mediterranean Games medalists in swimming
Universiade silver medalists for Italy
Swimmers of Gruppo Sportivo Esercito
Medalists at the 2009 Summer Universiade
20th-century Italian people
21st-century Italian people